Enköping Municipality (Enköpings kommun) is a municipality in Uppsala County in east central Sweden. Its seat is located in the city of Enköping.

The present municipality consists of nearly forty original local government units. They were grouped into greater municipalities in 1952 and Enköping Municipality was created in 1971 when the City of Enköping was amalgamated with five surrounding units.

Localities
Enköping (seat)
Örsundsbro
Fjärdhundra
Grillby
Hjälstaby
Hummelsta
Lillkyrka
Bredsand

Sister cities
Kaarina, Finland
Ølstykke, Denmark (about to change due to the upcoming major municipality changes in Denmark)
Nedre Eiker, Norway
Jõgeva, Estonia
Santa Rosa, Philippines

(Source:)

Sports
The most successful sports team of the city has for several years been the football team Enköpings SK, with one peak season in the Swedish Premier Division (Allsvenskan) in 2003. Unfortunately, the team has now faced the harsh reality of sports and economics and will be playing in Division 2 in 2008. Their home arena is called Enavallen and is situated in downtown Enköping.

References

External links

Enköping Municipality - Official site
Enköpings SK - Official site

 
Municipalities of Uppsala County